Texas was an unincorporated community in Tucker County, West Virginia, United States.

History
A post office called Texas was established in 1858, and remained in operation until 1909. The community was named after the state of Texas.

References 

Unincorporated communities in West Virginia
Unincorporated communities in Tucker County, West Virginia